Lai Chi Kok Park  is a large public park in Hong Kong, on the reclamation of former Lai Chi Kok Bay adjacent to Mei Foo, stretching along the Kwai Chung Road motorway. The park is managed by the Leisure and Cultural Services Department of the Hong Kong Government.

Features
The park contains a children's playground, a public swimming complex, an indoor sports centre (with squash courts, basketball courts, ballet studios and badminton courts), an outdoor running facility, a traditional Chinese garden, soccer fields, tennis courts and a skate park.

The swimming facility has two main, three training, two children's pools and one diving pool. The main pools are 1.2m-1.4m and 1.4m-1.9m in depth).

The Mei Foo skatepark is the largest skatepark in Hong Kong and also the most visited. It contains two half pipes and several quarter pipes, single rails and fun boxes. The skatepark has been visited by various professional skateboarders such as Chris Haslam, Terrell Robinson, and Mike Peterson. My Little Airport, a local indie band, made a song about it.

See also
 Lai Chi Kok Amusement Park

References

External links

 Official website

Lai Chi Kok
Urban public parks and gardens in Hong Kong